Dausset may refer to:

People with the surname
Jean Dausset (1916-2009), French immunologist.
Louis Dausset (1866-1940), French politician

Other
Fondation Jean Dausset-CEPH, research centre based in Paris, France.